Bruno Leonardo Formigoni (born April 18, 1990 in Sorocaba), is a Brazilian defensive midfielder. He currently plays for Inter de Limeira.

Career

Career statistics

As of 10 September 2010

Honours

Contract

References

External links

Bruno Formigoni at ZeroZero

1990 births
Living people
People from Sorocaba
Brazilian footballers
Brazilian expatriate footballers
Expatriate footballers in Japan
Brazilian expatriate sportspeople in Japan
Campeonato Brasileiro Série B players
Campeonato Brasileiro Série C players
Campeonato Brasileiro Série D players
J2 League players
São Paulo FC players
Cerezo Osaka players
Paulista Futebol Clube players
Figueirense FC players
Guaratinguetá Futebol players
Red Bull Brasil players
União Recreativa dos Trabalhadores players
São José Esporte Clube players
Clube Atlético Bragantino players
América Futebol Clube (RN) players
Esporte Clube XV de Novembro (Piracicaba) players
Clube Atlético Linense players
Batatais Futebol Clube players
Rio Claro Futebol Clube players
Associação Atlética Internacional (Limeira) players
Association football midfielders
Footballers from São Paulo (state)